This is a list of notable events in music that took place in the year 1995.

Specific locations
1995 in British music
1995 in Norwegian music

Specific genres
1995 in classical music
1995 in country music
1995 in heavy metal music
1995 in hip hop music
1995 in Latin music
1995 in jazz

Events

January–February
 January 1 – Mo Ostin steps down as chairman and CEO of Warner Music Group.
 January 8 – Pearl Jam frontman Eddie Vedder hosts "Self-Pollution Radio", a four-and-a-half hour radio broadcast with live performances by Pearl Jam, Soundgarden, Mudhoney, and others. Any station with a satellite receiver could pick up and carry the program.
 January 10 – Michel Sardou begins a record-breaking run of 113 shows at the Paris Olympia.
 January 14 – Perry Farrell is arrested for cocaine possession, being under the influence and possession of a syringe at a Los Angeles hotel.
 January 18 – Jerry Garcia crashes his rented BMW into a guard rail near Mill Valley, California, USA, but is not injured in the accident.
 January 20–February 5 – The Big Day Out festival takes place in Australia and New Zealand, headlined by Ministry, Primal Scream, Hole, The Cult and The Offspring. Originally, Oasis were also named in the lineup, but had to cancel their performance due to co-frontman Liam Gallagher losing his voice.
 January 27 – Live from the House of Blues premieres on TBS.
 February 1 – Welsh rock band Manic Street Preachers band member Richey James Edwards goes missing after leaving the London Embassy Hotel, UK at 7 am.
 February 7 – Rapper Tupac Shakur is sentenced to one-and-a-half to four-and-a-half years in prison on a sexual abuse charge. He is later released on appeal.
 February 12 – Iron Butterfly bassist Philip Taylor Kramer disappears from Highway 101, USA as he tried to get back home from the Los Angeles International Airport. He tried calling his family and 911 for help, but received none. His remains are found in 1999. 
 February 14 – Richey Edwards' Vauxhall Cavalier is found abandoned in a service station on the Bristol side of the Severn Bridge in the UK, with evidence that he had been living in it. Although he was near a notorious suicide spot, there is still no evidence to suggest he committed suicide.
 February 19
Roxette play to a crowd of 12,000 in Beijing, China, becoming the first Western band to be allowed to perform in the Workers' Indoor Arena for ten years.
Mötley Crüe drummer Tommy Lee marries Baywatch actress Pamela Anderson on a beach in Cancún, Mexico.
 February 25 – Lyle Lovett suffers a broken collarbone in an accident while riding his motorcycle in Mexico. The accident prevented Lovett from attending the Grammy Awards (he ended up winning two awards).

March–April
 March 1
 R.E.M. drummer Bill Berry leaves the stage during a concert in Switzerland after suffering a brain aneurysm. He undergoes successful brain surgery two days later in Switzerland.
 The 37th Annual Grammy Awards are presented in Los Angeles, hosted by Paul Reiser. Bruce Springsteen won four awards, including Song of the Year for "Streets of Philadelphia", while Tony Bennett's MTV Unplugged live album wins Album of the Year and Sheryl Crow's "All I Wanna Do" wins Record of the Year. Crow also wins Best New Artist. 
 March 8 – Former Helloween drummer, Ingo Schwichtenberg, commits suicide by jumping under a subway train.
 March 13 – Radiohead album The Bends and Elastica album Elastica are released.
 March 14 – With the release of Me Against the World, Tupac Shakur became the first male solo artist to have a number one album on the American Billboard 200 chart while in prison. The album remained at the top of the charts for four weeks.
 March 26 – Rapper Eric Lynn Wright, better known as Eazy-E, dies of complications from AIDS.
 March 28 – Lyle Lovett and actress Julia Roberts announce their separation after 21 months of marriage.
 March 30 – Celine Dion releases D'eux, which goes on to be the most successful French-language album of all time.
 March 31
 Tejano singer Selena is shot and killed by Yolanda Saldivar, her former personal assistant and former fan club president, who had recently been fired for embezzling money from the fan club. The event was called "Black Friday" by Hispanics worldwide.
 During a performance in Auburn Hills, Michigan, USA, Jimmy Page narrowly escapes being stabbed by a man who rushes the stage with a knife. The man was tackled by security guards who were injured in the brawl.
 April 17 – Ed Rosenblatt replaces David Geffen as chairman and CEO of Geffen Records.
 April 22 – Janet Jackson ends her Janet World Tour in London, England after nearly two years of touring. 
 April 29 – Tupac Shakur marries Keisha Morris inside the Clinton Correctional Facility, New York, USA. Shakur was serving a four-and-a-half year jail term on sexual assault charges. They would later divorce.

May–June
 May 5 – Former Guns N' Roses drummer Steven Adler is arraigned on a felony count of possession of heroin, in addition to two misdemeanor drug charges.
 May 13 – The 40th Eurovision Song Contest, held at Point Theatre in Dublin, Ireland, is won by Irish-Norwegian band Secret Garden, representing Norway with the song "Nocturne". This is the last competition with only one host until 2013.
 May 15 – Stone Temple Pilots singer Scott Weiland is arrested outside a motel in Pasadena, California, for possession of heroin and cocaine.
 May 19 – Sam Phillips makes her motion picture debut in the Bruce Willis action film, Die Hard with a Vengeance. Phillips plays one of the main terrorists in the film.
 June 1 – Alan Wilder leaves Depeche Mode.
 June 13 – Icelandic singer Björk releases Post, her critically acclaimed second album as a solo artist. The musically diverse album contained some of her most popular work to date, including "Army of Me", "Hyperballad", "I Miss You" and a Betty Hutton cover of "It's Oh So Quiet".
 June 16 – Michael Jackson released his first double-album HIStory, which became the best-selling multiple-album of all-time, with 35 million copies (70 million copies) sold worldwide.

July–August 
 July 3 – The members of TLC file for Chapter 11 bankruptcy, declaring debts of over $3.5 million.
 July 9 – The Grateful Dead performs its final show with Jerry Garcia at Soldier Field in Chicago. He dies one month later of a heart attack at the age of 53.
 July 14 – George Michael and Sony Music complete their acrimonious split. In 1994 Michael lost a lawsuit seeking to be released from his Sony contract, but he vowed to never sing for the company again. Michael will now record for the new label DreamWorks Records.
 July 17 – Robbie Williams announces he is leaving Take That.
 July 18 – Selena becomes the first Hispanic singer to have an album debut and peak at number-one on the US Billboard 200 chart. She also becomes the first and only female singer to place five albums simultaneously on the Billboard 200 chart.
 August 9
 Jerry Garcia of The Grateful Dead passes away of a heart attack at age 53. In cities all over the United States, deadheads spontaneously gather to mourn his death and celebrate his life.
 Kiss performs on MTV Unplugged. The band's current lineup is joined by original members Peter Criss and Ace Frehley, setting the stage for the band's reunion tour the following year.
 August 12 – The Offspring's Dexter Holland marries hairstylist Kristine Luna, who co-wrote the band's song "Session" from Ignition.
 August 22 – Rancid release their third studio album ...And Out Come the Wolves. Along with Green Day's Dookie and The Offspring's Smash (both released a year before), this album helped revive mainstream popular interest in punk rock in the mid-1990s, and becomes one of the best-selling independent records of all time. ...And Out Come the Wolves eventually goes platinum.
 August 23 – Dwayne Goettel of Skinny Puppy dies of a heroin overdose at his parents' home in Edmonton, Alberta, Canada.
 August 28
 Oingo Boingo announce that they will break up following a series of Halloween shows in Los Angeles, California, USA. Lead singer Danny Elfman has established a career scoring motion pictures.
 The official end of Sarah Records is marked with a farewell party featuring live sets by many of the label's acts. It was the last live appearance by The Orchids before they split up.
 August 29 – Al Jourgensen and Mike Scaccia of Ministry are arrested for heroin possession in two separate incidents in Texas.

September–October 
 September 1 – The Rock and Roll Hall of Fame opens in Cleveland, Ohio, USA.
 September 5 – The Luminiş Villa, George Enescu Memorial House, becomes an official memorial to the composer.
 September 5 – The Backstreet Boys release their debut single "We've Got It Goin' On".
 September 8 – For Squirrels vocalist Jack Vigliatura, bassist Bill White and manager Tim Bender are all killed in a van accident near Savannah, Georgia.
 September 15 – Alternative-country magazine No Depression publishes its first issue, with Son Volt on the cover.
 September 27 – Time Warner agrees to sell back its 50 percent share of Interscope Records. The media giant had come under intense fire for the explicit lyrics of rap artists on the label.
 October 2 
The first International Guitar Festival is held in Buenos Aires, Argentina.
Oasis release their second album, (What's the Story) Morning Glory?. The album spawns several number one singles around the world and eventually becomes the third best-selling album in the UK of all time.
October 10
 Mariah Carey performs at Madison Square Garden to promote her album Daydream.
 Green Day release their fourth album Insomniac. While it didn't sell as well as their previous album Dookie, it still sold 4 million copies.
 October 11 – Tupac Shakur is released from Clinton Correctional Facility, New York, USA, on US$1.4 million bail which was posted by Suge Knight. In return, Tupac signed a three-album deal with Knight's Death Row Records.
 October 21 – Blind Melon singer Shannon Hoon is found dead of a cocaine overdose at the age of 28.
 October 23 – Def Leppard enters the Guinness Book of World Records by performing three shows in three continents in the same day, playing Tangier, Morocco, London, England and Vancouver, British Columbia, Canada.
October 24 – The Smashing Pumpkins release their album Mellon Collie and the Infinite Sadness.
 October 30 – Oasis release their single "Wonderwall."

November–December 
 November 6 
 Cher releases her first album in four years, It's A Man's World, her first original recording for Warner Music Group. The album would get its U.S. debut in June 1996.
 Queen releases their final studio album that includes contributions from all original members following Freddie Mercury's death four years earlier. It goes on to be a huge success, selling 20 million copies worldwide.
 November 21
 dc Talk release their 4th studio album Jesus Freak. It was a departure from their previous hip hop albums taking on a rap rock sound. It achieved the biggest 1st week sales for a Christian album selling more than 80,000 copies in its first week and entering the Billboard Top 200 at #16. It is known as one of the most important Christian albums of all time.
 The Offspring re-release their debut album (which originally appeared in 1989), on CD for the first time. This proves to be the band's final release on Epitaph Records; they leave Epitaph and sign with Columbia Records the next year.
 Enrique Iglesias releases his debut album, in Spanish. It tops the Latin album charts and would go on to win a Grammy and produce five No. 1 singles on Billboards Hot Latin Tracks chart.
 December 4 – The Beatles release "Free As A Bird" as their first new single in over 20 years.
 December 21 – Madonna is subpoenaed to testify on January 3, 1996, against her stalker, Robert Hoskins, at the Criminal Courts Building in Los Angeles, California, USA. Hoskins was shot by a security guard outside her estate in Los Angeles in May 1995 for trespassing on her property and threatening to marry or kill her.
 December 31 – The twenty-fourth annual New Year's Rockin' Eve special airs on ABC, with appearances by Brandy, Goo Goo Dolls, Kool & The Gang, Martin Page, and The Rembrandts.

Also in 1995
 In Flames hires Björn Gelotte & Anders Fridén.
 Three members of R.E.M., Bill Berry, Mike Mills and Michael Stipe, fall ill while on the band's "Monster Tour". Berry suffers an aneurysm which required immediate surgery, Stipe suffers a hiatal hernia and Mills undergoes an appendectomy.
 Paul D'Amour leaves Tool.
 John Denver – The Wildlife Concert (US single: "For You")
 Kid 'n Play disbands.

 Bands formed 
 See * Musical groups established in 1995

 Bands disbanded 
 See :Category:Musical groups disestablished in 1995

 Bands reformed 
 Misfits (hiatus since 1983)
 Journey (since 1987)
 E Street Band (1995 Reunion Tour; officially reformed in 1999)

Albums released

January–March

April–June

July–September

October–December

Release date unknown

 12 Haunted Episodes - Graham Parker
 25 Cents – The Flys
 1979 – Joan Jett and the Blackhearts – EP
 Abandoned Garden – Michael Franks
 The Acoustic Album – Toyah
 The Age of Electric – The Age of Electric
 Ahitanaman - Life Garden
 Alfaro Vive, Carajo! – At the Drive-In – EP
 Alien 4 – Hawkwind
 Aphrokubist Improvisations, Vol. 9 - Broun Fellinis
 Ask the Fish – Leftover Salmon
 Balaee Fi Zamany - Nawal El Zoghbi
 Bowery Electric - Bowery Electric
 The Breathing Shadow – Nightingale
 Bumper to Bumper – Stroke 9
 Caca Bonita (EP) – Papa Roach
 Can We Go Home Now – The Roches
 Carpet – Ceremonial Oath
 Carry the Day - Henry Threadgill
 Cha Cha Cha – EMF 
 Company of Strangers – Bad Company
 Coughing Up a Storm – Frenzal Rhomb
 Defiance of the Ugly By the Merely Repulsive - Malformed Earthborn
 Devil Dog Road - Liar
 Devil in the Details – Saigon Kick
 Doubelievengod – Natas
 Dreamtime Wisdom, Modern Time Vision - Wirrinyga Band
 Dudebox (EP) – Pezz (Billy Talent)
 Dyslexicon – Dandelion
 En Route – Moebius & Plank
 Everything I Long For – Hayden
 Evil Stig – Joan Jett and The Gits
 Exotica 2000 - Korla Pandit
 Five Ways of Disappearing – Kendra Smith
 Fly – Sarah Brightman 
 The Future of What – Unwound 
 Gainsbourgsion! - April March 
 A Glorious Lethal Euphoria - The Mermen
 Gush – Lowlife
 Hank Plays Cliff – Hank Marvin
 Human – Gary Numan
 A Hundred Lovers – Timbuk3
 حبك موت (I Love You Till Death) - Ahlam
 Intelligence - DJ Rap

 Jill Sobule – Jill Sobule
 Lamprey – Bettie Serveert 
 The Light – Spock's Beard
 Loituma - Loituma 
 Looking Back – Toyah
 Ma Bassmahlak - Najwa Karam
 Musically Incorrect – Y&T 
 Mental Aquaducts (demo) – Limp Biscut (Limp Bizkit)
 Move Me – Nazareth
 Neu! 4 – Neu!
 Nine Livez – Nine
 Obey – Brainbombs
 One Hour – Cluster 
 Pacer – The Amps
 Pain – Dub War
 Palabras - Omara Portuondo
 The Pastoral – Not Rustic – World of Their Greatest Hits – Country Teasers
 Pezcore – Less Than Jake
 Project Infinity – Man or Astro-Man?
 The Remix Album – Prince Ital Joe & Marky Mark
 Rock!!!!! – Violent Femmes
 Rockabilly Filly - Rosie Flores
 Savage Poetry – Edguy
 Scent of Attraction - Patra
 Sea of Light – Uriah Heep
 Shampoo or Nothing - Shampoo
 Silver Sweepstakes – Knapsack
 Smokin – Kid Jonny Lang
 Soapy Water and Mister Marmalade – Sham 69
 Some Call It Godcore - Half Man Half Biscuit
 Spacegirl and Other Favorites - The Brian Jonestown Massacre
 Strange Cargo Hinterland – William Orbit
 Strange Emotion - Audio Sports
 Super Compact Disc - Masonna
 This Child – Susan Aglukark 
 To Love and Be Loved - Anne Clark
 Throbbing Pouch - Wagon Christ 
 ...Until Now – Stir
 Vee Vee – Archers of Loaf
 The Very Best of The Blues Brothers – The Blues Brothers (compilation)
 Wave of Popular Feeling – Groundswell
 White Zone – Psychedelic Warriors (Hawkwind)
 The Zero State – Arthur Loves Plastic

 Biggest hit singles 
The following songs achieved the highest aggregated positions in the charts of 1995.

Top 40 Chart hit singles

Other Chart hit singles

Notable singles

Other Notable singles

Top ten best albums of the year
The following ten albums from 1995 are the highest rated, as per aggregate ratings compiled from over 33,000 different "greatest album" charts. Results accurate as of April 2018.

 Radiohead – The Bends
 Oasis – (What's the Story) Morning Glory?
 The Smashing Pumpkins – Mellon Collie and the Infinite Sadness
 Pulp – Different Class
 Alanis Morissette – Jagged Little Pill
 Björk – Post
 GZA – Liquid Swords
 Elliott Smith – Elliott Smith
 P.J. Harvey – To Bring You My Love
 Pavement – Wowee Zowee

 Classical music 
 Osvaldas Balakauskas – Requiem
 Sally Beamish – Viola Concerto
 Luciano Berio – Sequenza XII
 Harrison Birtwistle – Panic (premiered at Last Night of the Proms)
 Elliott Carter – String Quartet No.5
 Mario Davidovsky – Violin Concertino
 Mario Davidovsky – Flashbacks for flute/piccolo/alto flute, clarinet/bass clarinet, violin, violoncello, piano, and percussion
 Frédéric Durieux – Départ for clarinet
 Ludovico Einaudi – Chatrang Overture
 Lorenzo Ferrero
 Seven Seconds, for clarinet, violin, and piano
 Shadow Lines, for flute and live electronics
 Philip Glass
 Saxophone Quartet
 String Sextet
 Melodies for saxophone
 Symphony No. 3, for string orchestra
 Concerto for Saxophone Quartet and Orchestra
 Andrew Glover – Fractured Vistas
 Simeon ten Holt
 Schaduw noch Prooi, for 2 pianos
 Eadem sed Aliter, for piano
 Houtaf Khoury
 Concerto for basset horn and orchestra
 Concerto for soprano saxophone, 6 percussionists and string orchestra
 Wojciech Kilar – How Will I Calm Myself, for voice and piano
 Ulrich Leyendecker – Violin Concerto
 Theo Loevendie – Piano Concerto
 Krzysztof Penderecki – Violin Concerto No. 2 Metamorphosen
 Karl Aage Rasmussen – Three Friends, for orchestra 
 John Serry Sr. – Concerto For Free Bass Accordion, piano transcription #1
 Stanisław Skrowaczewski – Passacaglia Immaginaria
 Michael Tippett – The Rose Lake
 Malcolm Williamson – A Year of Birds

 Opera 
 Roger Ames – Hearts on Fire
 Michael Easton – The Selfish Giant (for children)
 Stewart Wallace – Harvey Milk

 Jazz 

 Musical theater 
 Dracula – opened on 13 October in Prague, starring Daniel Hůlka
 Hello, Dolly! – Broadway revival
 How to Succeed in Business Without Really Trying – Broadway revival
 Kristina från Duvemåla – opened on 7 October in Malmö, Sweden
 Victor/Victoria – Broadway production opened at the Marquis Theatre and ran for 734 performances

 Musical films 
 Akropol
 Arabian Knight – animated feature
 Bye Bye Birdie
 Empire Records
 Gesualdo: Death for Five Voices
 Monster Mash
 Pocahontas – animated feature
 The Show

Births
January 1 – Poppy, American singer/songwriter, ambient music composer, and YouTuber
January 3 – Jisoo, South Korean singer, actress, and member of girl group BLACKPINK
January 7 
 Leslie Grace, American singer
 Jessica Darrow, American singer and actor
January 8 – Victoria Duffield, Canadian singer and actor
January 12 - Nathy Peluso,  Argentine singer, songwriter, dancer and pedagogue. 
January 17 - Heather Baron-Gracie, British singer, songwriter, and musician best known as the lead guitarist and vocalist for the indie rock band Pale Waves. 
January 20 – Joey Bada$$, American rapper
January 22 – Lexa, Brazilian singer, songwriter, and dancer
January 27 – Raz Fresco, Canadian rapper and producer
February 3 – Orla Gartland, Irish singer, songwriter, YouTuber, guitarist, multi-instrumentalist, and activist
February 7 = Masha Mnjoyan, Armenian singer 
February 15 – Megan Thee Stallion, American rapper, musician, and producer
February 16 – Denzel Curry, American rapper, singer and songwriter (Billie Eilish)
February 21 – Giveon, American singer-songwriter
February 25 – Francesca Michielin, Italian singer-songwriter
March 3 – Maine Mendoza, Filipina entertainer
March 5 – Lolo Zouaï,  French-born American R&B and pop musician
March 6 – Aimyon, Japanese singer and songwriter
March 11 – Sasha Alex Sloan, American singer-songwriter
April 5 – Daniel Caesar, Canadian singer-songwriter RNB/soul musician
April 11 – Dodie Clark, British singer-songwriter, musician, author and entertainer
April 19
Arizona Zervas, American singer-rapper-songwriter
Madison Love, American songwriter and singer 
April 21 – Madison Love, Japanese American singer-songwriter, producer and musician 
April 24
Kehlani, American singer songwriter
Ludmilla, Brazilian singer and songwriter
April 26
Lorenzo Fragola, Italian singer
Daniel Padilla, Filipino actor and singer
April 27 – Sarah Close, British singer-songwriter, YouTuber
April 28 – Melanie Martinez, American singer, songwriter, photographer, and director
May 2 – Lucy Dacus, American singer-songwriter and producer
May 4 – Shameik Moore, American actor, singer, and dancer
May 10 – Yoan Garneau, Canadian singer-songwriter
May 24 – Kiiara, American singer-songwriter
June 1 – Matthew Lewin, American producer (Magdalena Bay)
June 4 – Shiori Tamai, Japanese singer
June 5 – Troye Sivan, South African-Australian singer-songwriter, actor, and YouTuber
June 8 - Tom Grennan, English singer-songwriter
June 11 - Tems, Nigerian singer
June 14 – Alexandra Savior, American singer
June 15 – Tash Sultana, Australian singer-songwriter and multi-instrumentalist
June 20 – Serayah, American actress, model and singer
June 23 – Lauren Aquilina, English singer-songwriter, musician, music producer
June 26
Reema Major, Sudanese-Canadian rapper
Mitch James, New Zealand independent musician
July 1
Taeyong, South Korean rapper, dancer and member of NCT
Hoài Lâm, Vietnamese pop singer and actor
July 2
Ruth B, Canadian singer-songwriter 
Shirley Setia, Indian singer
July 4 – Post Malone, American rapper, singer-songwriter, and guitarist
July 11 – Tyler Medeiros, Canadian singer-songwriter and dancer
July 12 – Yohio, Swedish singer and songwriter active in Japan
July 13 – The Japanese House, aka Amber Bain, an English singer-songwriter, musician, multi-instrumentalist 
July 15 – Elyar, Azerbaijani-English musician, pop star, music producer, and singer-songwriter (Collaborator with Leadley) 
July 22
Marília Mendonça, Brazilian singer and songwriter (d. 2021)
Armaan Malik, Indian singer and songwriter
July 23 – Hwasa, South Korean singer-songwriter, dancer, and member of MAMAMOO
August 1 – Derrick Monasterio, Filipino actor, dancer and singer
August 8 – Malin Reitan, Norwegian singer
August 11 – Tierra Whack, American rapper, singer, and songwriter
August 16 – Hjalmer Larsen, Danish singer
August 22 – Dua Lipa, British singer-songwriter 
August 24 – Wenwen Han, Chinese child actress and violinist
August 29 – Gud, Swedish DJ and producer best known as a member of rapper Yung Lean's Stockholm-based group Sad Boys
September 18 – Megan Lee, Korean-American singer-songwriter and actress
September 19 – Chase Rice, American singer-songwriter
September 22 – Nayeon, South Korean singer and member of TWICE
September 25
Ryan Beatty, American singer
Sofía Reyes,  Mexican singer-songwriter and actress
September 29 – Julien Baker, American singer and guitarist 
October 4 – Caitlyn Shadbolt, Australian singer-songwriter
October 10 – Da'Vinchi, Haitian–American actor and rapper
October 13 – Jimin, South Korean singer-songwriter, dancer, and member of BTS
October 19 – Enca Haxhia, Albanian singer
October 21 – Doja Cat, American singer, rapper and songwriter
October 26 – Yuta Nakamoto, Japanese singer and member of NCT
November 6 – Anja Nissen, Danish-Australian singer, songwriter, dancer and actress
November 20 - Michael Clifford (musician), Australian musician,  best known as the lead guitarist of the pop rock band 5 Seconds of Summer.  
November 29 – Laura Marano, American actress and singer
December 3 – Angèle, Belgian singer-songwriter
December 6 – Tai Verdes, American singer
December 15 – Leadley, British musician, singer-songwriter, activist and YouTuber (collaborator with Elyar) 
December 17 – Tkay Maidza,  Zimbabwean-born Australian singer-songwriter and rapper
December 18 – Mica Tenenbaum, Argentine singer (Magdalena Bay)
December 23 – Jawny, American singer, songwriter, and producer.
December 27 – Caroline Pennell, American singer-songwriter
December 30
V, South Korean singer-songwriter, actor, and member of BTS
Dominic Fike, American singer- songwriter, multi instrumentalist, actor and rapper

 Deaths 
January 1 – Ted Hawkins, soul blues singer-songwriter, 58
January 24 – David Cole, producer (C+C Music Factory), 32
January 31 – George Abbott US librettist and director, 107
February 6 – Art Taylor, jazz drummer, 65
February 12 – Tony Secunda, Marc Bolan's former manager, 54 (heart attack)
February 18
Bob Stinson, guitarist (The Replacements), 35 (complications caused by drug and alcohol abuse)
Denny Cordell, English record producer, 51
February 23 – Melvin Franklin, The Temptations, 52 (brain seizure)
March 5 – Vivian Stanshall, eccentric British musician, 51 (house fire)
March 9 – Ingo Schwichtenberg, Helloween, 29 (suicide)
March 16 – Heinrich Sutermeister, Swiss composer, 84
March 17 – Sunnyland Slim, blues pianist, 88
March 26 – Eazy-E, rapper and record producer, 31 (AIDS)
March 28 – Mogens Ellegaard, accordionist, 60
March 29
Jimmy McShane, singer (Baltimora) (AIDS)
Roland Wolf, keyboardist (Nick Cave and the Bad Seeds, Einstürzende Neubauten), 29 or 30 (car accident)
March 30 – Paul A. Rothchild, American record producer, 59
March 31 – Selena, singer, 23 (murdered)
April 4 – Priscilla Lane, US singer and actress, 79 (lung cancer)
April 6 – Delroy Wilson, reggae artist, 46 (cirrhosis of the liver)
April 14 – Burl Ives, singer and actor, 85
April 25 – Ginger Rogers, US actress, dancer and singer, 83
May 6 – Barbarito Diez, Cuban singer and bandleader, 85
May 8 – Teresa Teng, singer, 42
May 16 – Lola Flores, Spanish singer and dancer, 72
May 25 – Dick Curless, country singer. 63
June 4 – Ernest Bornemann, jazz musician and critic, 80
June 12 – Arturo Benedetti Michelangeli pianist, 75
June 14 – Rory Gallagher, Irish blues/rock guitarist, 47 (complications from liver transplant)
June 30
Phyllis Hyman, R&B, soul and jazz singer, 45 (suicide by overdose of barbiturates)
Nazariy Yaremchuk, Ukrainian singer, 43
July 1 – Wolfman Jack, disc jockey, 57
July 2 – Zdeněk Košler, conductor, 67
July 8 – Günter Bialas, composer, 87
July 23 – Miklós Rózsa, film score composer, 88
July 25 – Charlie Rich, country singer and musician, 62
July 28 – Eddie Hinton, songwriter and session musician, 51
August 9 – Jerry Garcia, Grateful Dead, 53 (diabetes-related)
August 11
Allan McCarthy, Canadian singer of Men Without Hats, 38
Herbert Sumsion, English church musician, 96
August 16 – Bobby DeBarge, lead singer of Switch, 39 (AIDS)
August 18 – Alan Dell BBC Radio 2 disc jockey, 71
August 19
John Gilmore, jazz saxophonist, 63
Pierre Schaeffer, composer and pioneer of Musique concrète, 85
August 23 – Dwayne Goettel, industrial keyboard player (Skinny Puppy), 31 (drug overdose)
August 26 – Ronnie White, the Miracles, co-writer of the Temptations hit "My Girl" (with Smokey Robinson), 57 leukemia.
August 30 – Sterling Morrison, The Velvet Underground guitarist, 53 (Non-Hodgkin lymphoma)
September 5 
 Salil Chowdhury, Indian film composer and poet, 71
 Benyamin Sueb, Indonesian actor, comedian and singer, 56 (heart attack)
September 27 – Alison Steele, American disc jockey, 58
October 19 – Don Cherry, jazz trumpeter, 58 (liver cancer)
October 21
Maxene Andrews, singer, member of The Andrews Sisters, 79
Shannon Hoon, lead singer of group Blind Melon, 28 (drug overdose)
Hans Helfritz, German composer, 93
October 26 – Gorni Kramer, Italian bandleader and songwriter, 82
October 31
Alan Bush, composer, pianist and conductor, 94
Erika Morini, violinist, 91
November 2 – Florence Greenberg, music executive and producer, 82
November 3 – Isang Yun (Yun I-sang), composer, 78
November 7 – Jerry Daniels, The Ink Spots, 79
November 8 – Ion Baciu, conductor, 64
November 17 – Alan Hull, singer-songwriter and founder of Lindisfarne, 50 (heart thrombosis)
November 21
Peter Grant, manager of The Yardbirds, Led Zeppelin, Bad Company, 60 (myocardial infarction)
Matthew Ashman, guitarist of Adam and the Ants, Bow Wow Wow, 35
November 23 – Junior Walker, R&B and soul musician, 64
November 26 – David Briggs, record producer, 51
December 10 – Darren Robinson, rapper (The Fat Boys), 28
December 25
Dean Martin, singer and actor, 78 (cancer)
Nicolas Slonimsky, Russian-born conductor and composer, 101
December 27 – Shura Cherkassky, American classical pianist, 86
December 29 – Hans Henkemans Dutch composer, 82

 Awards 
 The following artists are inducted into the Rock and Roll Hall of Fame: The Allman Brothers Band, Al Green, Janis Joplin, Led Zeppelin, Martha and the Vandellas, Neil Young and Frank Zappa
 Inductees of the GMA Gospel Music Hall of Fame include Charles Wesley (writer of "Hark The Herald Angels Sing")
 Udit Narayan wins the Filmfare Best Male Playback Award.
Tetsuya Komuro (producer) & trf win the Japan Record Award for "Overnight Sensation"t the 37th Japan Record Awards.

 Grammy Awards 
 Grammy Awards of 1995

 Country Music Association Awards 
 1995 Country Music Association Awards

 Eurovision Song Contest 
 Eurovision Song Contest 1995

 Mercury Music Prize 
 Dummy – Portishead wins.

 MTV Video Music Awards 
 1995 MTV Video Music Awards

ChartsTriple J Hottest 100'
Main article: Triple J Hottest 100, 1995

See also
 1995 in British music
 Record labels established in 1995

References

 
20th century in music
Music by year